Nanhu Lake may refer to the following lakes in China:

 South Lake (Jiaxing) (pinyin: Nán Hú)
 South Lake (Wuhan)
 Nanhu Lake, Ma'anshan

See also
 Nanhu (disambiguation)